The arrondissement of Langres is an arrondissement of France in the Haute-Marne department in the Grand Est region. It has 157 communes.

Composition

The communes of the arrondissement of Langres are:

Aigremont
Andilly-en-Bassigny
Anrosey
Aprey
Arbigny-sous-Varennes
Arbot
Auberive
Aujeurres
Aulnoy-sur-Aube
Avrecourt
Baissey
Bannes
Bay-sur-Aube
Beauchemin
Belmont
Bize
Bonnecourt
Bourbonne-les-Bains
Bourg
Brennes
Celles-en-Bassigny
Celsoy
Chalancey
Chalindrey
Champigny-lès-Langres
Champigny-sous-Varennes
Champsevraine
Changey
Chanoy
Charmes
Chassigny
Le Châtelet-sur-Meuse
Chatenay-Mâcheron
Chatenay-Vaudin
Chaudenay
Chauffourt
Chézeaux
Choilley-Dardenay
Cohons
Coiffy-le-Bas
Coiffy-le-Haut
Colmier-le-Bas
Colmier-le-Haut
Coublanc
Courcelles-en-Montagne
Culmont
Cusey
Dammartin-sur-Meuse
Dampierre
Damrémont
Dommarien
Enfonvelle
Farincourt
Faverolles
Fayl-Billot
Flagey
Frécourt
Fresnes-sur-Apance
Genevrières
Germaines
Gilley
Grandchamp
Grenant
Guyonvelle
Haute-Amance
Heuilley-le-Grand
Humes-Jorquenay
Isômes
Laferté-sur-Amance
Laneuvelle
Langres
Larivière-Arnoncourt
Lavernoy
Lavilleneuve
Lecey
Leuchey
Les Loges
Longeau-Percey
Maâtz
Maizières-sur-Amance
Marac
Marcilly-en-Bassigny
Mardor
Melay
Montcharvot
Le Montsaugeonnais
Mouilleron
Neuilly-l'Évêque
Neuvelle-lès-Voisey
Noidant-Chatenoy
Noidant-le-Rocheux
Occey
Orbigny-au-Mont
Orbigny-au-Val
Orcevaux
Ormancey
Le Pailly
Palaiseul
Parnoy-en-Bassigny
Peigney
Perrancey-les-Vieux-Moulins
Perrogney-les-Fontaines
Pierremont-sur-Amance
Pisseloup
Plesnoy
Poinsenot
Poinson-lès-Fayl
Poinson-lès-Grancey
Poiseul
Praslay
Pressigny
Rançonnières
Rivière-les-Fosses
Rivières-le-Bois
Rochetaillée
Rolampont
Rouelles
Rougeux
Rouvres-sur-Aube
Saint-Broingt-le-Bois
Saint-Broingt-les-Fosses
Saint-Ciergues
Saint-Loup-sur-Aujon
Saint-Martin-lès-Langres
Saint-Maurice
Saints-Geosmes
Saint-Vallier-sur-Marne
Sarrey
Saulles
Saulxures
Savigny
Serqueux
Soyers
Ternat
Torcenay
Tornay
Vaillant
Val-de-Meuse
Le Val-d'Esnoms
Valleroy
Vals-des-Tilles
Varennes-sur-Amance
Vauxbons
Velles
Verseilles-le-Bas
Verseilles-le-Haut
Vesvres-sous-Chalancey
Vicq
Villars-Santenoge
Villegusien-le-Lac
Villiers-lès-Aprey
Violot
Vitry-en-Montagne
Vivey
Voisey
Voisines
Voncourt

History

The arrondissement of Langres was created in 1800.

As a result of the reorganisation of the cantons of France which came into effect in 2015, the borders of the cantons are no longer related to the borders of the arrondissements. The cantons of the arrondissement of Langres were, as of January 2015:

 Auberive
 Bourbonne-les-Bains
 Fayl-Billot
 Laferté-sur-Amance
 Langres
 Longeau-Percey
 Neuilly-l'Évêque
 Prauthoy
 Terre-Natale
 Val-de-Meuse

References

Langres